Yours Sincerely is the third album by British R&B/pop group The Pasadenas, released in 1992 by Columbia Records. It contains re-recordings of songs by other artists that the band were fans of and had provided inspiration for them, including a cover of New York City's 1973 hit single, "I'm Doing Fine Now", which reached number four in the UK Singles Chart, becoming The Pasadenas' highest-placing single on that chart. The album also includes three further singles which reached the UK chart: a cover of the Bread hit "Make It with You" (No. 20), "I Believe in Miracles" (No. 34) and "Moving in the Right Direction" (No. 49).

Track listing

Charts

Certifications

References

External links
Yours Sincerely at Discogs

1992 albums
Columbia Records albums
Covers albums
The Pasadenas albums